The enzyme imidazoleglycerol-phosphate dehydratase catalyzes the chemical reaction

D-erythro-1-(imidazol-4-yl)glycerol 3-phosphate  3-(imidazol-4-yl)-2-oxopropyl phosphate + H2O

This enzyme belongs to the family of lyases, specifically the hydro-lyases, which cleave carbon-oxygen bonds.  The systematic name of this enzyme class is D-erythro-1-(imidazol-4-yl)glycerol-3-phosphate hydro-lyase [3-(imidazol-4-yl)-2-oxopropyl-phosphate-forming]. Other names in common use include IGP dehydratase, and D-erythro-1-(imidazol-4-yl)glycerol 3-phosphate hydro-lyase.  This enzyme participates in histidine metabolism as it is involved in the 6th step of histidine biosynthesis as part of a nine step cyclical pathway.

There are two isoforms of IGPD; IGPD1 and IGPD2. The different isoforms are highly conserved with only 8 amino acids differing between them. These subtle differences however affect their activity but as yet it is unknown how.

In most organisms IGPD is a monofunctional protein of about 22 to 29 kD. In some bacteria such as Escherichia coli, it is the C-terminal domain of a bifunctional protein that include a histidinol-phosphatase domain. In E. coli, this is the protein encoded by the hisB gene.

Inhibition 
Certain compounds that inhibit IGPD have been used as herbicides  as animals do not have this protein. One of these inhibitors is 3-Amino-1,2,4-triazole (3-AT), which has also been used as a competitive inhibitor of the product of the yeast HIS3 gene (another IGPD), e.g. in the yeast two-hybrid system.

Structural studies

References

Further reading

 

EC 4.2.1
Enzymes of known structure